Aleksey Spiridonov (born 26 June 1988) is a Russian volleyball player, a member of Russia men's national volleyball team and Russian club Zenit Kazan, European Champion 2011, gold medalist of the World League (2011, 2013).

Career
In 2011 he was punished by Volleyball Federation of Russia because of drunkenness for six months.

During match with Germany at World Championship 2014 held in Poland, he showed gesture "rifle shooting" in the direction of fans. This was seen as a lack of respect for the fans and he was cautioned by the FIVB. Repeatedly insulted the Polish nation in interviews with Russian media. During the match against Poland, he spat on MP Marek Matuszewski, which he denied. In May 2015 Spiridonov was suspended for 2 matches for his misbehavior in the match against Germany. Spiridonov will miss two games at the start of the World League on May 28 and 29 against Poland.

Sporting achievements

Clubs

CEV Champions League
  2008/2009 - with Iskra Odintsovo
  2014/2015 - with Zenit Kazan
  2015/2016 - with Zenit Kazan

CEV Cup
  2009/2010 - with Iskra Odintsovo

CEV Challenge Cup
  2012/2013 - with Ural Ufa

FIVB Club World Championship
  Betim 2015 - with Zenit Kazan

National championships
 2008/2009  Russian Championship, with Iskra Odintsovo
 2011/2012  Russian Championship, with Iskra Odintsovo
 2012/2013  Russian Championship, with Ural Ufa
 2014/2015  Russian Cup 2015, with Zenit Kazan
 2014/2015  Russian Championship, with Zenit Kazan
 2015/2016  Russian SuperCup 2015, with Zenit Kazan
 2015/2016  Russian Cup 2016, with Zenit Kazan
 2015/2016  Russian Championship, with Zenit Kazan

Individually
 2014 Memorial of Hubert Jerzy Wagner - Best Receiver

References

External links

 Alexey Spiridonov at the International Volleyball Federation
 Alexey Spiridonov at Zenit-Kazan
 

1988 births
Living people
Russian men's volleyball players
VC Zenit Kazan players
Ural Ufa volleyball players